Lentsweletau is a village in Kweneng District of Botswana. It is located 60 km north of Gaborone. The population was 4,916 in 2011 census. A large percentage of the population is from the Bakwena tribe, and its capital is called Molepolole, also in the Kweneng District. The name Lentsweletau translates as a Lentswe = Rock (or rocky hill), le = and, tau = lion.

Lentsweletau was put on the map in the 1970s by a very popular musician named Cobra Kenalemang, who inspired another Lentsweletauan, Kotaeshwele, who came to picture with his hit "Kotaeshwele o dira mathaithai" in the mid 1980s. It is up again with the popular Toyota Desert Race as a stopover for vehicles filling up petrol and anyone wanting to spend a night in the area and having fun.

References

Kweneng District
Villages in Botswana